Hearts and Unicorns is the debut studio album by the American indie rock band Giant Drag. It was released September 13, 2005 in the United States and February 27, 2006 in the United Kingdom by Kickball Records. It was the second release by the band after their debut EP Lemona, released in 2004. 

The album's UK release and subsequent 2006 North American repressing include a cover of Chris Isaak's "Wicked Game" as a bonus track.

Recording
Hearts and Unicorns was recorded at Dirty Little Studios and Paramount Studios in Los Angeles, California in 2005. Regarding "Kevin Is Gay", Annie Hardy stated: "Kevin is just a guy though, the song is nothing to do with him. But this guy, a friend of ours, hacked into our website, so it's a response to him. We posted up on there, 'Kevin, stop posting all this stupid crap on our website. Come and see us tomorrow when we'll be debuting our new song "Kevin is Gay"'. And the title just stuck."

Hardy said in an interview that the clip at the beginning of the track is her imitating the sound of the shoryuken special move from the Street Fighter series of arcade games.

Critical reception

Jason Crock of Pitchfork awarded the album a 6.8 out of 10 rating, noting: "All these silly song titles and nearly frightening studio patter scratch the surface of something, the way the snippets on a record like Surfer Rosa add another layer of inscrutability, but monochromatic guitars overwhelm the album and mute the few moments of quirk."

The Independents Luiza Sauman awarded the album four out of five stars, describing it as a "heavenly, potty-mouthed mixture of My Bloody Valentine, Nirvana, and The Breeders...  some songs you can give or take, but their promise always shines through." Sinéad Gleeson of The Irish Times also awarded the album four out of five stars, comparing it favorably to the work of Throwing Muses, My Bloody Valentine, and Mazzy Star, noting that the songs "view the rubbish heap of modern life through a distorted, shoegazing lens. Hardy sings, chain-smokes, plays guitar and bass, and writes the cruel, damaged-goods lyrics." A review published in The Daily Telegraph likened the album to the works of PJ Harvey, adding: "Giant Drag, shockingly but mainly pleasingly, are not just another pair of too-cool-for-school LA rock kids. Nor are they vacuous provocateurs. They're imaginative and playful."

David Smyth of the Evening Standard gave the album a middling review, awarding it three out of five stars, noting that "Hardy has a way with an effects pedal and a wicked tongue...  tracks such as "My Dick Sux" continue to give a false impression of the beauty within, although the exquisite "This Isn't It" suggests that when Hardy grows up she might write something really special."

Alternative radio station 97X ranked the album at number 48 in a list of the 97 best albums of 2005. Dispatch-Argus journalist Sean Leary also included the album in his list of the best albums of the year.

Track listing

Personnel
All personnel credits adapted from the album's liner notes.

Giant Drag
Annie Hardylead vocals, guitar , bass 
Micah Calabresedrums, synthesizer, guitar 

Guest musicians
Joe Cardamone guitar , backing vocals 
Louis Castleguitar , organ , trumpet , backing vocals 
Alvin DeGuzmanguitar 
Don Devorebass 
Daniel Holdenbass 
Gabe Garnickaslide bass , guitar , lap steel 
Sandra Vuflute

Engineering
James Barianproduction, bass 
Alan Yoshidamastering
Ryan Castleproduction 
Dave Sardyproduction 

Art personnel
Annie Hardyart direction, illustrations
Dan Monickart direction, photography
Wendy HiggsA&R

References

2005 debut albums
Giant Drag albums
Interscope Records albums